The Bougainville white-eye (Zosterops hamlini) is a species of bird in the family Zosteropidae. It is found on Bougainville Island. Its natural habitat is in subtropical or tropical moist montane forests. The Bougainville white-eye was formerly considered a subspecies of the grey-throated white-eye (Zosterops fuscicapilla).

References

Bougainville white-eye
Birds of Bougainville Island
Bougainville white-eye
Bougainville white-eye